Execution is a 1968 Italian Spaghetti Western film directed by Domenico Paolella.

Cast 

 John Richardson: John Cooler / Bill Cooler
 Mimmo Palmara: Clint Clips (credited as Dick Palmer)
 Franco Giornelli: Captain Charlie
 Piero Vida: Burt
 Rita Klein: Carol
 Néstor Garay: Juarez

References

External links

1968 films
Films directed by Domenico Paolella
Spaghetti Western films
1968 Western (genre) films
Films scored by Lallo Gori
1960s Italian films